Gor Khatri (Hindko and Urdu: گورکهٹڑی) (or Gor Khuttree; literally meaning "Warrior's Grave") is a Mughal-era caravanserai located in Peshawar, Pakistan.

History 
Gorkhatri in the ancient city of Peshawar was identified by Alexander Cunningham with the Kanishka stupa, the giant stupa of Indian King Kanishka the Great, while Professor Dr. Ahmad Hasan Dani identified it with the place where the famous tower of the Buddha bowl once stood.

The celebrated Chinese pilgrim Xuanzang, who visited Gandhara in the early 7th Century CE, had paid glowing tribute to the city and the Kanishka stupa in his memoirs. He also talked about a site, which many historians argue refers to Gorkhatri where "Buddha's giant bowl was kept".

Mughal Emperor Babar, who recorded its importance in his autobiography, visited the place in the Babur Nama

In the early 16th century, Jahanara Begum, daughter of Mughal Emperor Shah Jahan, built a pavilion at the ancient site, and converted the site into a caravanserai, and named it Sarai Jahanabad. She also constructed a Jama Masjid, a sauna bath and two wells inside Sarai Jahanabad for the convenience of travelers.

The Sikhs converted the site into the residence and official headquarters of their mercenary general Paolo Avitabile who was governor of Peshawar from 1838-1842. They constructed a Hindu temple for Shiva there. Prof. S.M. Jaffar, in his monumental book "Peshawar: Past and Present", identified it with the place of Hindu pilgrimage where they performed the Sardukahr ritual (shaving off heads).

Layout 
Gorkhatri is a typical Mughal-era serai and is located on one of the highest points of Peshawar city. It is a fortified compound consisting of an area of 160x160 square meters. It has two prominent gateways: one in the east and one in the west. The Goraknath Temple is situated in the centre, a network of cells and buildings in the southern and western side of the complex and a fire brigade building, which was built in 1917.

Excavations 

Dr. Farzand Ali Durrani initiated the first vertical excavations at Gor Guthrree in 1992-93 but his excavation work could not be completed due to lack of funds. However, he confirmed the city foundation went back to at least the 3rd Century BC.

The second round of excavations carried on until 2007 in the north eastern aspect of Gorkhatri pushed Peshawar's age by another couple of centuries, officially making it the oldest living city in South Asia.

Gallery

References

External links 

 Feature on Gor Khatri - The News 07-01-2007
 Article lamenting decline of Gor Khatri - DAWN 04-11-2012

Tourist attractions in Peshawar
Caravanserais in Pakistan
Archaeological sites in Khyber Pakhtunkhwa
Hindu pilgrimage sites in Pakistan
Populated places in Peshawar District
Hinduism in Khyber Pakhtunkhwa